Kutang may refer to:
 Manaslu, also known as Kutang, a mountain in the Himalayas
 Kutang language, a Tibeto-Burman language of Nepal

See also 
 Qutang Gorge, in China